Thung Fai is a tambon (subdistrict) of Mueang Lampang District, in Lampang Province, Thailand. In 2020 it had a total population of 7,697 people.

Administration

Central administration
The tambon is subdivided into 10 administrative villages (muban).

Local administration
The whole area of the subdistrict is covered by the subdistrict administrative organization (SAO) Thung Fai (องค์การบริหารส่วนตำบลทุ่งฝาย).

References

External links
Thaitambon.com on Thung Fai

Tambon of Lampang province
Populated places in Lampang province